The following is a list of notable deaths in September 2014.

Entries for each day are listed alphabetically by surname. A typical entry lists information in the following sequence:
Name, age, country of citizenship and reason for notability, established cause of death, reference.

September 2014

1
David Anderle, 77, American record producer (The Doors), cancer.
Liaqat Ali Bangulzai, Pakistani politician and columnist.
Bernard Baran, 49, American teacher's aide, wrongfully convicted of indecent assault.
Pat Barrington, 74, American actress, lung cancer.
Ralf Bendix, 90, German Schlager singer, music producer, composer and songwriter.
Frank Calloway, 99, American artist and longevity claimant.
Mary T. Clark, 100, American religious sister, academic, and civil rights advocate.
Dillard Crocker, 89, American basketball player.
Mark Gil, 52, Filipino actor, cirrhosis.
Ahmed Abdi Godane, 37, Somali militant, Emir of al-Shabaab (2009–2010, since 2011), airstrike.
Arturo Hammersley, 92, Chilean Olympic skier.
Donnie Humphrey, 53, American football player (Green Bay Packers).
Jimi Jamison, 63, American musician (Survivor), hemorrhagic brain stroke.
Jim Jennings, 73, American college basketball player (Murray State Racers).
Gottfried John, 72, German actor (Berlin Alexanderplatz, GoldenEye), cancer.
Mzee Kaukungwa, 94, Namibian politician.
Mile Kos, 89, Serbian football player and coach and sportswriter.
A. J. Langguth, 81, American historian and journalist.
Roger McKee, 87, American baseball player (Philadelphia Phillies).
Charlie Powell, 82, American football player (San Francisco 49ers, Oakland Raiders) and boxer.
Maya Rao, 86, Indian Kathak dancer, cardiac arrest.
Sergio Rodrigues, 86, Brazilian architect and designer.
Hugh McGregor Ross, 97, English computer scientist and theologian.
Joseph Shivers, 93, American textile chemist, developed spandex.
Bala Tampoe, 92, Sri Lankan lawyer and trade unionist, General Secretary of the Ceylon Mercantile Union.
Elena Varzi, 87, Italian actress (Path of Hope), cardiac arrest.
*Yoon Jung-chun, 41, South Korean football player and coach.

2
Thierry Bianquis, 78-79, French orientalist and arabist.
Cao Keming, 81, Chinese politician.
Bob Cain, 80, American radio and television journalist.
Peter Carter, 57, British diplomat, Ambassador to Estonia (2007–2012), Deputy High Commissioner to Nigeria (since 2012), heart attack.
Jack Culpin, 86, Australian politician, member of the Victorian Legislative Assembly for Glenroy (1976–1985) and Broadmeadows (1985–1988).
F. Emmett Fitzpatrick, 84, American attorney and politician, District Attorney of Philadelphia (1974–1978), Alzheimer's disease.
Cayo Sila Godoy, 94, Paraguayan classical guitarist.
Norman Gordon, 103, South African Test cricketer.
J. LaMoine Jenson, 79, American religious leader, President of the Priesthood of the Apostolic United Brethren (since 1977), colon cancer.
Jiang Zhonghua, Chinese Navy rear admiral, suicide.
Dino Menardi, 91, Italian Olympic ice hockey player.
William "Bill" Ralph Merton, 96, British military scientist and financier.
Helena Rakoczy, 92, Polish gymnast, Olympic bronze medalist (1956) and world champion (1950).
Paul W. Robertson, 59, Canadian television executive, cancer.
Sándor Rozsnyói, 83, Hungarian steeplechase runner, Olympic silver medalist (1956) and European champion (1954).
Steven Sotloff, 31, American journalist (Time), beheading. (death announced on this date)
Su Nan-cheng, 78, Taiwanese politician.
Goolam Essaji Vahanvati, 65, Indian lawyer, Attorney General (2009–2014), heart attack.
Antonis Vardis, 66, Greek composer and singer, cancer.
A. P. Venkateswaran, 84, Indian diplomat, Foreign Secretary (1986–1987).
James White, 76, Irish politician and hotelier.

3
Abu Al-Izz Al-Hariri, 68, Egyptian politician.
Dorothy Braxton, 87, New Zealand journalist.
Marina von Ditmar, 99, German film actress.
Thawan Duchanee, 74, Thai painter, architect and sculptor,  liver failure.
EunB, 22, South Korean singer, traffic accident.
Quintin Goosen, 67, Zimbabwean cricketer and umpire.
Roy Heather, 79, English television actor (Only Fools and Horses).
Mark Otway, 82, New Zealand tennis player. (death announced on this date)
Aarno Raninen, 70, Finnish actor, composer and musician, house fire.
Andy Stapp, 70, American political activist, founded the American Servicemen's Union.
Zeus, 5, American Great Dane, world's tallest dog, natural causes.

4
Martynas Andriukaitis, 33, Lithuanian basketball player, suicide.
Donatas Banionis, 90, Lithuanian Soviet actor (Solaris), stroke.
Terry W. Brown, 64, American politician, cancer.
Giuseppe Carattino, 95, Italian Olympic sailor.
Riva Castleman, 84, American art historian.
Clare Cathcart, 48, British actress (Call the Midwife, Doctors), asthma attack.
Gustavo Cerati, 55, Argentine singer and musician (Soda Stereo), respiratory arrest.
René Radembino Coniquet, 81, Gabonese politician.
Franca Falcucci, 88, Italian politician, Minister of Education (1982–1987).
Mohammed Fazal, 92, Indian politician, Governor of Maharashtra (2002–2004).
Willie Finlay, 88, Scottish footballer (East Fife).
Philip Hough, 90, English cricketer (Cheshire, Wiltshire).
Włodzimierz Kotoński, 89, Polish composer.
Gerrit Kouwenaar, 91, Dutch poet, recipient of the P. C. Hooft Award (1970).
Roy Leonard, 83, American radio personality (WGN), esophageal infection.
Hopeton Lewis, 66, Jamaican singer, kidney failure.
Edi Mall, 90, Austrian Olympic alpine skier.
Mizchif, 38, Zimbabwean rapper.
Habib Wali Mohammad, 93, Pakistani ghazal singer.
Maggie Morris, 88, Canadian radio and television personality (Flashback).
Ron Mulock, 84, Australian politician, Deputy Premier of New South Wales (1984–1988).
John Ondawame, 60, Indonesian-born Swedish activist, advocate for West Papuan independence, heart attack.
Orunamamu, 93, American storyteller.
Joseph B. Raynor, Jr., 91, American politician, member of the North Carolina Senate (1965–1992).
Jacqueline Risset, 78, French poet.
Joan Rivers, 81, American comedian, actress (Spaceballs) and television host (Fashion Police), cardiac arrest.
Ichirō Satsuki, 95, Japanese rōkyoku performer.
Hagen Schulze, 71, German historian.
Edgar Steele, 69, American lawyer and convicted criminal.
David Wynne, 88, British sculptor.

5
Rubel Ahmed, 26, Bangladeshi immigrant to Britain, suspected heart attack.
Simone Battle, 25, American singer (G.R.L.), suicide by hanging.
Kerrie Biddell, 67, Australian jazz and session singer, stroke.
Feroze Butt, 72, Pakistani Test cricket umpire.
Karel Černý, 92, Czech art director and production designer (Amadeus).
Ramkanai Das, 78-79, Bangladeshi folk and classical musician.
Arnold Fine, 90, American editor (The Jewish Press) and humor columnist.
Noel Hinners, 78, American scientist and administrator, NASA Chief Scientist (1987–1989), brain tumor.
Sanford Kadish, 92, American criminal law scholar.
David Lomax, 76, British television reporter and interviewer (Panorama).
Nicole Lubtchansky, French film editor (Celine and Julie Go Boating, La Belle Noiseuse).
Todor Manolov, 63, Bulgarian Olympic athlete.
Bruce Morton, 83, American news correspondent (CBS, CNN), cancer.
Mara Neusel, 50, German mathematician.
Wolfhart Pannenberg, 85, German theologian.
Ken Reed, 72, American CFL player (Edmonton Eskimos, Saskatchewan Roughriders), traffic collision.
Hemendra Chandra Singh, 46, Indian politician.
Eoin Young, 75, New Zealand motoring journalist.

6
Peter F. B. Alsop, Australian engineer and historian.
Arne Amundsen, 62, Norwegian footballer (Lillestrøm SK).
Clyde F. Bel Jr., 82, American businessman.
Odd Bondevik, 73, Norwegian theologian.
Dominique Darbois, 89, French photojournalist.
Andy DePaul, 85, American boxer.
Jim Dobbin, 73, British politician, MP for Heywood and Middleton (since 1997).
Hendrik Fernandez, 81, Indonesian politician, Governor of East Nusa Tenggara (1988–1993), complications from a stroke.
Cirilo Flores, 66, American Roman Catholic prelate, Bishop of San Diego (since 2013), prostate cancer.
Stefan Gierasch, 88, American actor (Carrie, Dark Shadows, High Plains Drifter).
Édith Girard, 65, French architect.
Molly Glynn, 46, American actress (Chicago Fire, In America), struck by falling tree.
Martin Harrison, 65, British-born Australian poet, heart attack.
János Héder, 80, Hungarian Olympic gymnast.
Seth Martin, 81, Canadian Olympic ice hockey player (Spokane Jets, St. Louis Blues), heart attack.
Royal Nebeker, 69, American painter and print maker.
A. W. Pryor, 86, Australian physicist.
Emma Richards, 87, American pastor, first female pastor of a Mennonite congregation.
Yoko Yamaguchi, 77, Japanese songwriter and novelist, winner of the Naoki Prize (1985), respiratory failure.
Kira Zvorykina, 94, Soviet-born Belarusian chess player, triple national champion (1960, 1973, 1975).

7
Genrikh Abaev, 81, Belarusian engineer.
Nikolay Adamets, 30, Belarusian footballer (Granit Mikashevichi), cerebral hemorrhage.
Jacque Batt, 88, American political figure, First Lady of Idaho.
Vasu Chanchlani, 62, Indo-Canadian serial entrepreneur, philanthropist and trans-nations builder.
Jack Cristil, 88, American radio sports broadcaster (Mississippi State Bulldogs), complications from kidney disease and cancer.
Maryna Doroshenko, 33, Ukrainian basketball player (national team), leukemia.
Joseph B. Ebbesen, 89, American politician and optometrist.
Harry Evans, 68, Australian public servant, Clerk of the Australian Senate (1988–2009).
Raul M. Gonzalez, 83, Filipino politician, Secretary of Justice (2004–2009), multiple organ failure.
Don Keefer, 98, American actor (Butch Cassidy and the Sundance Kid, Gunsmoke, The Twilight Zone).
Zsolt Kézdi-Kovács, 78, Hungarian film director.
Subramanian Krishnamoorthy, 84–85, Indian Tamil writer.
Kwon Ri-se, 23, South Korean singer (Ladies' Code), injuries sustained in a traffic collision.
Neal Peters McCurn, 88, American federal judge.
Frederic Mullally, 96, British journalist and novelist.
Anahita Ratebzad, 82, Afghan politician and diplomat.
Eberhard Schlotter, 93, German painter.
Harold Shipp, 88, Canadian businessman.
Douglas E. Smith, 53, American video game designer (Lode Runner).
Elsa-Marianne von Rosen, 90, Swedish ballet dancer and actress.
Yoshiko Yamaguchi, 94, Chinese-born Japanese actress (Eternity) and singer, member of the House of Councillors (1974–1992), heart failure.

8
Roger Auque, 58, French journalist and diplomat, Ambassador to Eritrea (2009–2012), cancer.
Jane Baker, British television writer (Doctor Who, Space: 1999, Watt on Earth).
Marvin Barnes, 62, American basketball player.
Robert Bauer, 64, German mycologist.
Lee Behel, 64, American air racer, plane crash.
S. Truett Cathy, 93, American restaurateur and businessman, founder of Chick-fil-A.
Errol Clince, 61, New Zealand hunter, cancer.
Erhard Egidi, 85, German cantor and organist.
Mary G. Enig, 83, American nutritionist.
Rashi Fein, 88, American professor of health economics.
Bobby Fong, 64, American academic, President of Ursinus College (since 2011).
Justin Gocke, 36, American actor (Santa Barbara, Simon & Simon).
Goose Gonsoulin, 76, American football player (Denver Broncos).
Edward R. Hauser, 98, American animal scientist.
Yuriy Kabanov, 75, Russian sprint canoer.
Kevin O'Neill, 95, Australian cricketer.
Sean O'Haire, 43, American professional wrestler, suicide by strangulation.
Magda Olivero, 104, Italian operatic soprano.
Tibor Rudas, 94, Hungarian entrepreneur.
Ken Staples, 87, American baseball player, coach and manager.
Gerald Wilson, 96, American jazz musician, pneumonia.
George Zuverink, 90, American baseball player (Baltimore Orioles), pneumonia.

9
Montserrat Abelló i Soler, 96, Spanish poet and translator.
Hassan Aboud, 35-36, Syrian rebel leader, bomb attack.
Firoza Begum, 84, Bangladeshi singer.
Emilio Botín, 79, Spanish financier (Santander Group).
Neil Brown, 62, Australian footballer.
Vaduvur Srinivasa Desikachariar, 85, Indian scholar.
Howell Evans, 86, Welsh actor (Stella).
Samuel Gitler Hammer, 81, Mexican mathematician.
Graham Joyce, 59, British speculative fantasy author, cancer.
Denny Miller, 80, American actor (Tarzan, the Ape Man, Wagon Train), amyotrophic lateral sclerosis.
Bob Suter, 57, American ice hockey player, Olympic champion (1980), heart attack.
Tang Yijie, 87, Chinese philosopher.
Antonín Tučapský, 86, Czech-born British composer.
David Whyte, 43, English footballer (Charlton Athletic).
Robert Young, 49, Scottish guitarist (Primal Scream).

10
Robert William Dean, 94, American diplomat.
Grant Dunlap, 90, American baseball player (St. Louis Cardinals).
Ntiero Effiom, 67, Nigerian football coach.
António Garrido, 81, Portuguese football referee.
Richard Kiel, 74, American actor (The Spy Who Loved Me, Happy Gilmore, Tangled), heart attack.
Oldřich František Korte, 88, Czech composer and pianist.
Walter Lewis McVey, Jr., 92, American politician.
Edward Nelson, 82, American mathematician, professor emeritus (Princeton University).
Yoshinori Sakai, 69, Japanese athlete, lit cauldron at the 1964 Summer Olympics, cerebral hemorrhage.
Károly Sándor, 85, Hungarian footballer.
George Spencer, 88, American baseball player (New York Giants).
Paul K. Sybrowsky, 70, American businessman, President of Southern Virginia University (2012–2014).
Hans Petter Tholfsen, 67, Norwegian harness racer.
Joakim Vislavski, 73, Serbian football player (Partizan) and manager (Hajduk Kula).
Ernst Wilfer, 91, German engineer.

11
Bob Crewe, 82, American songwriter ("Big Girls Don't Cry", "Rag Doll") and record producer (The Four Seasons).
Antoine Duhamel, 89, French composer and conductor.
Fletcher Dulini Ncube, 74,  Zimbabwean politician.
Mirko Ellis, 91, Swiss-Italian actor, self-defenestration.
Kendall Francois, 43, American serial killer, apparent natural causes.
Joachim Fuchsberger, 87, German actor (Edgar Wallace movies), television host and lyricist.
Jerônimo Garcia de Santana, 79, Brazilian politician, Governor of Rondônia (1987–1991), Mayor of Porto Velho (1986).
Hamish McHamish, 15, Scottish celebrity cat, chest infection.
Rudolf Kortokraks, 86, German painter.
Cosimo Matassa, 88, American recording engineer and studio owner.
Elizabeth Whelan, 71, American consumer rights activist, founder of the American Council on Science and Health.
Ali Yahya, 66, Israeli diplomat.

12
Vasile Anghel, 76, Romanian footballer.
Edmundo Domínguez Aragonés, 75, Mexican journalist.
Mahant Avaidyanath, 93, Indian politician.
John Bardon, 75, English actor (EastEnders).
Fred Britton, 82, Canadian curler.
André Dran, 90, French singer.
Atef Ebeid, 82, Egyptian politician, Prime Minister (1999–2004).
Salah El Mahdi, 89, Tunisian musicologist and composer.
 Peter Erős, 81, Hungarian-American conductor, cerebral hemorrhage.
Theodore J. Flicker, 84, American writer and director (Barney Miller, The President's Analyst).
Joseph Abangite Gasi, 86, South Sudanese Roman Catholic prelate, Bishop of Tombura-Yambio (1974–2008).
John Gustafson, 72, English singer and bassist (Ian Gillan Band, Roxy Music, The Big Three).
Henrik Have, 68, Danish artist and writer.
Zoran Knežević, 66, Serbian Yugoslav politician and judge.
Lonnie Lynn, 71, American basketball player (Pittsburgh Pipers) and spoken word poet.
Anwar Ali Noon, 90, Pakistani politician.
Ian Paisley, Baron Bannside, 88, Northern Irish politician, first minister (2007–2008), MP (1970–2010) and member of the House of Lords (since 2010).
Warren Perkins, 92, American basketball player (Tri-Cities Blackhawks).
Dimitry Pospielovsky, 79, Canadian historian.
Hugh Royer, Jr., 78, American professional golfer.
Bengt Saltin, 79, Swedish physiologist.
Joe Sample, 75, American jazz musician (The Crusaders), and songwriter ("One Day I'll Fly Away", "Street Life").
Sir Donald Sinden, 90, English actor (The Cruel Sea, The Day of the Jackal, Two's Company), prostate cancer.
Ts'ao Yung-ho, 93, Taiwanese historian.
Herbert Vorgrimler, 85, German theologian.
Zhou Weizhi, 98, Chinese musician and politician, Minister of culture.
Harold Williams, 90, Welsh football player.
Abdel Rahman Zuabi, 82, Israeli judge.

13
Benjamin Adekunle, 78, Nigerian army leader.
Bjørn Tore Bryn, 77, Norwegian news anchor.
Marvin Cheung, 67, Hong Kong accountant and politician, Chairman of the AAHK (2008–2014), unofficial member of the Executive Council (2005–2012), leukemia.
Robert M. Ellis, 92, American artist.
Iberê Ferreira, 70, Brazilian politician, Governor of Rio Grande do Norte (2010–2011).
Helen Filarski, 90, American baseball player (AAGPBL).
Milan Galić, 76, Serbian Yugoslav Olympic champion footballer (1960), (national team).
David Cawthorne Haines, 44, British humanitarian aid worker and ISIS hostage, beheading. (death reported on this date)
Shelley Riley Moore, 88, American educator, First Lady of West Virginia (1969–1977, 1985–1989).
Dmitry Sakunenko, 84, Russian Soviet Olympic speed skater (1956).
Matthew Sands, 94, American physicist.
Frank Torre, 82, American baseball player (Milwaukee Braves, Philadelphia Phillies), cardiac arrest.
Paul Valenti, 94, American college basketball coach (Oregon State).
Nigel Walker, 97, British criminologist, Wolfson Professor of Criminology (1973–1984).

14
Isidoro Álvarez, 79, Spanish businessman, CEO of El Corte Inglés.
Tony Auth, 72, American Pulitzer Prize-winning cartoonist, cancer.
Behrens, 20, American thoroughbred racehorse.
Bruno Castanheira, 37, Portuguese racing cyclist.
Saifuddin Choudhury, 62, Indian politician, leader of the CPI(M), cancer.
Servílio Conti, 97, Italian-born Brazilian Roman Catholic prelate, Bishop of Roraima (1965–1975).
Thoma Deliana, 88-89,  Albanian politician.
José Gómez, 70, American civil rights activist and academic.
Assheton Gorton, 84, English production designer (101 Dalmatians, Legend, The French Lieutenant's Woman).
Peter Gutteridge, 53, New Zealand singer and guitarist (The Clean, The Chills, Snapper).
Miroslav Hlinka, 42, Slovak ice hockey player, gold medalist at the 2002 IIHF World Championship, suicide by hanging.
Takatada Ihara, 85, Japanese television producer and director, heart disease.
Kireet Joshi, 83, Indian philosopher and educationist, cancer.
Boris Khimichev, 81, Russian actor.
Benoy Krishna Konar, 84, Indian politician, member of the West Bengal Legislative Assembly.
Angus Lennie, 84, Scottish actor (The Great Escape, Crossroads, Doctor Who).
E. Jennifer Monaghan, 81, English-born American historian, stroke.
Chase N. Peterson, 84, American physician and academic, President of the University of Utah (1983–1991).
Philip Somerville, 84, English milliner.

15
Iwao Akiyama, 93, Japanese printmaker.
John Anderson, Jr., 97, American politician, Governor of Kansas (1961–1965).
Jeremy Ball, 45, Australian politician and actor (The Matrix), Deputy Mayor of Launceston, Tasmania (since 2011), traffic collision.
Ted Belytschko, 71, American mechanical engineer.
Giuliana Berlinguer, 80, Italian director, screenwriter, and novelist.
Roger Blomquist, 57, Swedish sports journalist (SVT).
Post Bahadur Bogati, 61, Nepalese politician, brain hemorrhage following cardiac arrest.
Thomas Hale Boggs, Jr., 73, American lawyer, lobbyist and politician, heart attack.
Jackie Cain, 86, American jazz vocalist (Jackie and Roy), complications from a stroke.
Dame Peggy Fenner, 91, British politician, MP for Rochester and Chatham (1970–1974, 1979–1997).
Eugene I. Gordon, 84, American physicist.
Yitzhak Hofi, 87, Israeli general, Director of Mossad (1974–1982).
Nicholas Romanov, Prince of Russia, 91, French-born Russian claimant to the headship of the House of Romanov (since 1992).
Jürg Schubiger, 77, Swiss psychotherapist and children's author.
Claude A. Simard, 71, Canadian painter.
Wayne Tefs, 67, Canadian writer, cancer.
Marjorie Thompson, 60,  American biologist and musician.
François Wahl, 89, French literary editor.
Glen Whitten, 78, American Olympic diver.

16
Edward Atienza, 90, British actor.
Narendra Dave, 64, Kenyan cricket umpire.
Grant Evans, 65, Australian anthropologist and historian.
H. M. Fowler, 96, American politician.
Michael Hayes, 85, British television director (Doctor Who, Z-Cars, An Age of Kings) and newsreader.
Buster Jones, 71, American voice actor (Super Friends, The Transformers, The Real Ghostbusters).
Jef Lataster, 92, Dutch Olympic long-distance runner (1948).
John Moat, 78, British poet, founded the Arvon Foundation.
Alf Ivar Samuelsen, 72, Norwegian politician, tractor crash.
Mary Speer, 89, American southern gospel singer (Speer Family).
Linganath Subbu, 83, Indian cricketer.
Dinis Vital, 82, Portuguese footballer.

17
Hari Kumar Audichya, 84, Indian politician.
Glenn D. Broyles, 88, American politician.
Marianne Clausen, 66, Danish musicologist and choir conductor.
Lisa Ann Coleman, 38, American criminal, executed.
Renée Klang de Guzmán, 97, Dominican philanthropist, First Lady of the Dominican Republic (1978–1982).
George Hamilton IV, 77, American country music singer (Abilene), complications from a heart attack.
Andriy Husin, 41, Ukrainian football player (Dynamo Kyiv, Krylia Sovetov, national team) and coach, traffic collision.
Wakachichibu Komei, 75, Japanese sumo wrestler.
Elaine Lee, 74, South African-born Australian actress (Number 96).
John Lofton, 73, American political commentator.
Sir Charles Read, 95, Australian air marshal.
Street Cry, 16, Irish thoroughbred racehorse, euthanised.
Lorna Thomas, 96, Australian cricket player and manager.
Welby Van Horn, 94, American tennis player and coach.
Peter von Bagh, 71, Finnish film historian.
China Zorrilla, 92, Uruguayan actress (Elsa & Fred), pneumonia.

18
Richard Arenstorf, 84, American mathematician.
Shakil Auj, 54, Pakistani Islamic researcher and scholar, shot.
Jan Berdyszak, 78, Polish artist.
Margie Day, 88, American R&B singer.
Oleg Ivanovsky, 92, Russian spacecraft designer (Vostok, Prognoz).
Patrick Lowry, 77, Irish Olympic sprinter.
Milan Marcetta, 77, Canadian ice hockey player (Toronto Maple Leafs, Minnesota North Stars).
Will Radcliff, 74, American businessman, creator of the Slush Puppie.
George Radwanski, 67, Canadian journalist and civil servant, Privacy Commissioner (2000–2003), heart attack.
Earl Ross, 73, Canadian race car driver.
Hirofumi Uzawa, 86, Japanese economist, pneumonia.
Olivier Vanneste, 84, Belgian politician and economist, Governor of West Flanders (1979–1997).
Kenny Wheeler, 84, Canadian jazz trumpeter.

19
André Bergeron, 92, French trade union leader.
Hans-Georg Bohle, 66, German geographer.
Keith Brueckner, 90, American theoretical physicist.
Milton Cardona, 69, Puerto Rican jazz musician, heart failure.
Püreviin Dagvasüren, 71, Mongolian traditional wrestler.
Bill Detrick, 87, American college basketball coach (Central Connecticut Blue Devils).
Peggy Drake, 91, Austrian-born American actress (King of the Mounties).
Gaby Dlugi-Winterberg, 65, German international footballer.
Marcel Dussault, 88, French road racing cyclist.
Francisco Feliciano, 73, Filipino composer and conductor.
Avraham Heffner, 79, Israeli filmmaker (Laura Adler's Last Love Affair).
Audrey Long, 92, American film actress (Tall in the Saddle).
Robert Long, 77, British army officer.
Iain MacCormick, 74, Scottish politician, MP for Argyll (1974–1979).
H. Tyler Marcy, 96, American business executive (IBM).
Rod Milgate, 80, Australian painter, playwright and newsreader, heart attack.
John Mlacak, 78, Canadian politician and artist.
Hilda Oates, 89, Cuban actress.
Bronisław Pawlicki, 88, Polish Olympic field hockey player (1952).
U. Srinivas, 45, Indian mandolin player, complications from a liver transplant.
K. Udayakumar, 54, Indian volleyball player, cardiac arrest.
Derek Williams, 89, Welsh rugby union player (Cardiff).

20
Anton-Günther, Duke of Oldenburg, 91, German noble.
Anatoly Berezovoy, 72, Soviet cosmonaut (Soyuz T-5).
Polly Bergen, 84, American singer and actress (Cape Fear, Cry-Baby, Desperate Housewives), Emmy winner (1958).
Rob Bironas, 36, American football player (Tennessee Titans), traffic collision.
Ron Bishop, 71, American off-road motorcycle racer.
Erich Bloch, 75, Zimbabwean economist.
Vince Callahan, 82, American politician, member of the Virginia House of Delegates (1968–2008), West Nile meningitis.
Pino Cerami, 92, Italian-born Belgian cyclist.
J. California Cooper, 82, American playwright and author.
Takako Doi, 85, Japanese politician, Speaker of the House of Representatives (1993–1996), pneumonia.
Eric the Actor, 39, American dwarf, member of The Wack Pack.
Odette Gartenlaub, 92, French pianist and composer.
Kamara James, 29, Jamaican-born American Olympic fencer (2004).
Ashok Ramchandra Kelkar, 85, Indian linguist and writer.
John J. Lloyd, 92, American art director and production designer (Animal House, The Blues Brothers, The Thing), heart failure.
Erik Ninn-Hansen, 92, Danish politician.
Kazusuke Ogawa, 84, Japanese literary critic, stomach cancer.
Randy Pike, 60, American politician, member of the Missouri House of Representatives (since 2012).
Alfred Prinz, 84, Austrian composer and clarinetist.
Igor Radin, 76, Serbian Yugoslav Olympic ice hockey player.
Ramón Rojas, 35, Chilean BASE jumper, training accident.
George Sluizer, 82, Dutch filmmaker (The Vanishing), cardiovascular disease.
Erwin Sparendam, 80, Surinamese-born Dutch footballer.
Şeref Taşlıova, 76, Turkish storyteller.
M. B. W. Tent, 69, American author and educator.

21
Shirley Baker, 82, British photographer.
Les Bruckner, 96, American football player.
Diana Capponi, 61, Canadian mental health activist, breast cancer.
Cecilia Cenci, 72, Argentine actress, brain cancer.
Anne-Marie Deschodt, French actress and writer.
Linda Griffiths, 60, Canadian actress and playwright, breast cancer.
Michael Harari, 87, Israeli intelligence officer.
Caldwell Jones, 64, American basketball player (Philadelphia 76ers, Portland Trail Blazers), heart attack.
Ed Koffenberger, 88, American basketball and lacrosse player (Duke University), leukemia.
Galina Konovalova, 98, Russian actress (Uncle Vanya).
Ruben Kun, 72, Nauruan politician, President (1996–1997) and Speaker of Parliament (1981–1986).
John Chrysostom Lan Shi, 89, Chinese Roman Catholic prelate, Bishop of Sanyuan (2003–2008).
Sheldon Patinkin, 79, American theatre director.
Joseph Plaskett, 96, Canadian painter.
Alastair Reid, 88, Scottish poet and scholar.
Scott Ross, 45, American football player (New Orleans Saints), heart failure.
Jan Werner, 68, Polish sprinter, Olympic silver medalist (1976).

22
Nanda Prasad Adhikari, 51–53, Nepali activist.
Fernando Cabrita, 91, Portuguese football player and manager.
Alexey Chervonenkis, 76, Russian mathematician (Vapnik–Chervonenkis theory).
Anandji Dossa, 98, Indian cricket statistician.
Ezra Heymann, 86, Venezuelan philosopher.
Ray Lambrecht, 96, American car dealer.
Nikita Larionov, 82, Russian writer.
Skip E. Lowe, 85, American talk show host, emphysema.
E. J. Mishan, 96, English economist.
Samira Saleh Ali al-Naimi, 50–51, Iraqi human rights activist and lawyer, executed.
Billy Neil, 75, Scottish footballer (Queen's Park, Airdrieonians).
Sahana Pradhan, 88, Nepalese politician, brain haemorrhage.
Alexis Sarei, 80, Papua New Guinean politician and diplomat, Premier of North Solomons Province (1976–1980, 1984–1987).
Cara Silverman, 54, American film editor (Super, He's Just Not That Into You, A Cinderella Story).
Erik van der Wurff, 69, Dutch pianist and composer, cancer.
Flor Van Noppen, 58, Belgian politician, MP (2007–2014), multiple system atrophy.
Hans E. Wallman, 78, Swedish film director, producer and composer, injuries sustained in a horse riding accident.
Ben Webb, 38, New Zealand artist.

23
Alaviyya Babayeva, 93, Azerbaijani writer and translator, People's Artist of the Azerbaijani SSR.
Myrtle Baylis, 94, Australian cricket and netball international.
A. W. Davis, 71, American basketball player (University of Tennessee) and coach.
Irven DeVore, 79, American anthropologist.
John Divers, 74, Scottish footballer.
Anatoly Eiramdzhan, 77, Russian-Armenian film director.
Robin Freeman, 80, American college basketball player (Ohio State).
Mullah Ghani, Afghan politician, Governor of Nimruz Province (1995), shot.
Henryk Glücklich, 69, Polish speedway rider.
Gabriel Gómez Michel, 49, Mexican politician, MP for Jalisco (since 2012), homicide. (body discovered on this date)
Gilles Latulippe, 77, Canadian comedian, actor and theatre manager, lung cancer.
Don Manoukian, 80, American football player (Oakland Raiders).
Kresimir Sipusch, 84, Croatian-born Yugoslav composer and conductor.
Al Suomi, 100, American professional hockey player (Chicago Blackhawks).
George Herbert Swift Jr, 88, American mathematician and computer scientist.
John Toner, 91, American football coach and athletic administrator (University of Connecticut).
Shankar Vaidya, 86, Indian Marathi poet and writer.
Margaret Vogt, 64, Nigerian diplomat.
John Baptist Wang Jin, 90, Chinese Roman Catholic prelate, Bishop of Yuci (since 1999).
Don Wollett, 95, American author, arbiter and college professor.

24
Mohsen Amiraslani, 36-37, Iranian psychoanalyst, execution.
Catherine Beattie, 93, American farmer and politician.
Eckart Berkes, 65, German Olympic hurdler (1972).
Fred Branfman, 72, American author and anti-war activist, amyotrophic lateral sclerosis.
Ron Butlin, 89, Canadian ice hockey executive.
Deborah Cavendish, Duchess of Devonshire, 94, British writer and socialite, last surviving Mitford sister.
Sir Edward Eveleigh, 96, British judge, Lord Justice of Appeal.
Ailo Gaup, 70, Norwegian Sami author.
Reuben Greenberg, 71, American police chief.
Sebastian Haag, 35, German extreme skier and mountaineer, avalanche.
Christopher Hogwood, 73, English conductor.
Carlotta Ikeda, 73, Japanese butoh dancer, liver cancer.
Ray Isherwood, 76, Australian cricket umpire.
Ken James, 80, Canadian politician, MP for Sarnia—Lambton (1984–1993).
Vladimir Kadyshevsky, 76, Russian theoretical physicist.
Madis Kõiv, 84, Estonian author, physicist and philosopher.
Greg Mackey, 52, Australian rugby league player (South Sydney, Warrington, Hull F.C.), bowel cancer.
Sir Gordon Manzie, 84, British civil servant, Chief Executive of the Property Services Agency.
Lily McBeth, 80, American transgender teacher.
Jack Mezirow, 91, American educationalist.
Karl Miller, 83, British literary editor (The Listener, London Review of Books).
Priscilla Mitchell, 73, American country music singer.
Hugh C. Rae, 78, Scottish author.
Derek Roe, 76–77, British archaeologist.
Stephen Sykes, 75, English Anglican prelate, Bishop of Ely (1990–1999).
Abu Yusuf Al-Turki, 47, Turkish terrorist, commander of al-Nusra Front, air strike. (death reported on this date)

25
Toby Balding, 78, American-born British racehorse trainer.
Ulrick Chérubin, 70, Haitian-born Canadian politician, Mayor of Amos, Quebec (since 2002).
Vladimir Dolbonosov, 65, Russian footballer (Dynamo Moscow).
Jaak Joala, 64, Estonian Soviet singer.
Jim Kincaid, 84, American football player (Washington Redskins).
Bonnie Lynn Tempesta, 61, American food manufacturer, cancer.
Sulejman Tihić, 62, Bosnian politician, Member of the Presidency (2002–2006), cancer.
Dorothy Tyler-Odam, 94, British athlete, Olympic silver medalist (1936, 1948).
Christine Vladimiroff, 74, American nun.
Barbara Washburn, 99, American mountaineer, first woman to climb Mount McKinley.
Cedric Wyatt, 74, Australian public servant and indigenous rights advocate.

26
Michaela Andörfer, 85, German Roman Catholic nun.
Jim Boeke, 76, American football player (Dallas Cowboys) and actor (Coach, Star Trek VI: The Undiscovered Country).
Charles Dobzynski, 84-85, French poet, journalist and translator.
Wouter Gortzak, 83, Dutch journalist (Het Parool) and politician, member of the House of Representatives (1998–2002).
Hermann Greiner, 94, German World War II flying ace.
Sam Hall, 93, American television writer (Dark Shadows, One Life to Live).
Astrid Dirdal Hegrestad, 85, Norwegian politician.
Wolfgang Hutter, 85, Austrian artist.
Michael McCarty, 68, American actor (Casper, ER), heart failure.
Tony McMichael, 71, Australian epidemiologist, complications of pneumonia.
Gerry Neugebauer, 82, American astronomer, complications of spinocerebellar ataxia.
Tamir Sapir, 67, Georgian-born American businessman.
Takamaro Shigaraki, 87–88, Japanese Buddhist philosopher.
Maggie Stables, 70, British actress (Doctor Who).
Shao Tong, 20, Chinese student (Iowa State University), suffocated. (body discovered on this date)
Guro Valen, 54, Norwegian professor of medicine, cancer.
Zelda, 11+, American wild turkey, resident of New York City's Battery Park, traffic collision. (body found on this date)

27
Gaby Aghion, 93, French fashion designer (Chloé).
Gil Aldema, 86, Israeli composer and conductor.
Angelo Arrigoni, 91, Italian rugby union and professional rugby league footballer.
Joan Benesh, 94, British ballet dancer, pneumonia.
Lou Curtis, 86, Australian cricketer.
Anna Morpurgo Davies, 77, Italian-born British philologist.
Eugie Foster, 42, American science fiction author, respiratory failure.
Taylor Hardwick, 89, American architect, cancer.
Harry Harley, 88, Canadian politician, MP for Halton (1962–1968).
Wally Hergesheimer, 87, Canadian professional ice hockey player (Chicago Blackhawks, New York Rangers).
Park Honan, 86, American literary scholar.
Abdelmajid Lakhal, 74, Tunisian theatre director and actor.
Antti Lovag, 94, Hungarian architect.
Sarah Danielle Madison, 40, American actress (7th Heaven, Jurassic Park III, Training Day), natural causes.
Dorothy Maharam, 97, American mathematician.
Jean-Jacques Pauvert, 88, French publisher.
Michael Scott-Joynt, 71, English Anglican prelate, Bishop of Stafford (1987–1995) and Winchester (1995–2011).
Earl Smith, 86, American baseball player (Pittsburgh Pirates).
James Traficant, 73, American politician, member of the U.S. House of Representatives for Ohio's 17th district (1985–2002).
Zhang Xianliang, 77, Chinese author and poet.

28
Dannie Abse, 91, British doctor and poet.
Joseph H. Alexander, 76, American historian and Marine Corps officer.
Lisbeth Bodd, 56, Norwegian performance artist and theatre leader.
Daniel F. Clark, 59, American politician, member of the Pennsylvania House of Representatives (1989–2002), lung cancer.
Nicolae Corneanu, 90, Romanian Orthodox hierarch, Metropolitan of Banat (since 1962).
Daniel Dion, 55-56, Canadian artist.
Roy Ebron, 63, American basketball player (Utah Stars).
Jim Eley, 81, Australian footballer.
Sheila Faith, 86, British politician, MP for Belper (1979–1983).
Paul Fatt, 90, British neuroscientist.
Lubomír Havlák, 92, Czech opera singer.
Ralph Maxwell, 94, American district judge and athlete.
Sirkka Polkunen, 86, Finnish Olympic cross-country skier.
 George R. Poulos, 87, American politician, mayor of Flint, Michigan (1962-1964).
Tim Rawlings, 81, English footballer (West Bromwich Albion, Walsall).
George Roberts, 86, American trombonist.
José Luis Serna Alzate, 78, Colombian Roman Catholic prelate, Bishop of Florencia (1978–1989) and Líbano–Honda (1989–2002).
John Sheridan, 72, American politician, former New Jersey Transportation Commissioner, stabbing of undetermined cause.
Petr Skoumal, 76, Czech musician and composer.
Jakob Stämpfli, 79, Swiss bass concert singer.
Ieke van den Burg, 62, Dutch politician, MEP (1999–2009).
Jan Vodička, 82, Czech Olympic ice hockey player (1956).
Sophia Yin, 48, American veterinarian and animal behaviorist, suicide by hanging.

29
Warren Anderson, 92, American businessman.
JP Auclair, 37, Canadian freestyle skier, avalanche.
Walter Evan Black Jr., 88, American federal judge.
Miguel Boyer, 75, French-born Spanish economist and politician, Minister of Economy, Treasury and Commerce (1982–1985), pulmonary embolism.
Mary Cadogan, 86, British writer.
Tarik Carson, 68, Uruguayan-born Argentine writer and painter.
Carlo Curis, 90, Italian Roman Catholic prelate and diplomat, Apostolic Nuncio to Canada (1990–1999).
Richard Dickerson, 77, American politician, member of the California State Assembly (1998–2002), mayor of Redding, California.
Hugh Doherty, 93, Irish footballer (Celtic).
Andreas Fransson, 31, Swedish extreme skier, avalanche.
Mohammad Ghouse, 83, Indian cricket umpire.
Stan Monteith, 85, American author and radio host.
Luis Nishizawa, 96, Mexican painter.
John Ritchie, 93, New Zealand composer.
Len Ronson, 78, Canadian-born American ice hockey player (New York Rangers).
Pat Sawilowsky, 83, American Jewish community leader.
George Shuba, 89, American baseball player (Brooklyn Dodgers).
Len Stephenson, 84, English footballer.

30
Jadir Ambrósio, 91, Brazilian musician and composer.
Iftikhar Hussain Ansari, 72, Indian Kashmiri cleric, politician and businessman.
Billie Barry, Irish dance instructor.
Thomas A. Benes, 63, American Marine Corps major general, myelodysplastic syndrome.
Kaj Björk, 95, Swedish politician and diplomat.
Lidya Buzio, 65, Uruguayan-born American ceramist, cancer.
Sandra Cano, 55-57, American anti-abortion activist.
Ralph Cosham, 78, British-born American actor (Starman, The Pelican Brief, The Elder Scrolls IV: Oblivion).
Victor Crespo, 81, Portuguese politician, President of the Assembly of the Republic (1987–1991).
Hama Arba Diallo, 75, Burkinabé politician and diplomat.
Roselyn P. Epps, 83, American pediatrician and public health physician.
Peter Eriksson, 50, Swedish curler.
Erik Hansen, 74, Danish canoeist, Olympic champion (1960).
Iemasa Kayumi, 80, Japanese voice actor (Lupin III, One Piece, Astro Boy).
Jerrie Mock, 88, American pilot, first woman to fly solo around the world.
San W. Orr, Jr., 73, American businessman.
Martin Lewis Perl, 87, American physicist, discovered the tau particle, Nobel Prize laureate in Physics (1995), heart attack.
Ren Runhou, 56, Chinese businessman and politician.
Yevgeny Samsonov, 88, Russian rower, Olympic silver medalist (1952).
Sheila Tracy, 80, British broadcaster and musician (Big Band Special).
Xu Lizhi, 24, Chinese poet and factory worker, suicide.

References

2014-09
 09